Crotonylfentanyl is an opioid analgesic that is an analog of fentanyl and structural isomer of cyclopropylfentanyl and has been sold online as a designer drug. In December 2019, the UNODC announced scheduling recommendations placing crotonylfentanyl into Schedule I.

See also 
 Valerylfentanyl
 Acrylfentanyl

References 

Anilides
Designer drugs
Mu-opioid receptor agonists
Piperidines
Synthetic opioids